Chak No.22 Bhagowal (چک نمبر22 بھاگووال) is the main village of Tehsil Malakwal, Mandi Bahauddin District, Punjab.

Climate 

Bhagowal is classified as a local steppe climate and BSh by the Köppen-Geiger system. It is a place of low rainfall, averaging  of precipitation annually, ranging from an average of 5 mm in November to an average of 167 mm in August.

The temperature averages , ranging from an average of 33.8 degrees Celsius in June to average of temperature of 12.2 degrees Celsius in January.

References 

Villages in Mandi Bahauddin District